Send or SEND may refer to:give

Send
Send (album), a 2003 album by the rock band Wire
The Send, an American alternative rock band
Send, Surrey, a village in England
Send (HM Prison), a women's prison in Send, Surrey
Send, Iran (disambiguation), places in Iran
Aux-send, an output from an audio mixer which is usually designed to carry a given channel to an effects or monitor device
Send! (magazine), a Christian missionary magazine by Gospel for Asia

SEND
Secure Neighbor Discovery, a security extension of the Neighbor Discovery Protocol
Satellite Emergency Notification Device, a portable emergency notification and locating device
Standard for Exchange of Non-clinical Data, a data model for non-clinical research data
Special educational needs and disability, an acronym used in the UK